2010 Tochigi S.C. season

League table

Domestic results

J2 League 
As of the 5 December 2010, these are all the matches they played for 2010 season.
Tochigi SC results for 2010.  (Japanese)

J2 Official Reference to results

Emperor's Cup

Player statistics

References

External links 
 J. League official site

Tochigi S.C.
Tochigi SC seasons